Otto Albert O'Pelt (12 February 1888 – 11 July 1963) was an Australian rules footballer who played with St Kilda in the Victorian Football League (VFL).

Family
The son of Julius Richard Opelt (1849-1915), and Rosa Opelt (1864-1947), née Drews, Otto Albert Opelt was born at Port Melbourne on 12 February 1888.

Football
One of nine new players in the team, Opelt played his only First XVIII match for St Kilda against Carlton, at Princes park, on 29 July 1911. They were required because many of the regular St Kilda First XVIII  players were on strike.

The other new players were: Alby Bowtell, Roy Cazaly, Claude Crowl, Peter Donnelly, Alf Hammond, Rowley Smith, Tom Soutar, and Bill Ward — and, including that match, and ignoring Harrie Hattam (16 games), Bert Pierce (41 games), and Bill Woodcock (65 games), the very inexperienced team's remaining fifteen players had only played a total of 46 matches.

Notes

References

External links 

1888 births
1963 deaths
Australian rules footballers from Melbourne
St Kilda Football Club players
People from Port Melbourne